Willem Wilmink (Enschede, 25 October 1936 – 2 August 2003) was a Dutch poet and writer. He was best known for the large number of songs he wrote for popular children programs and his accessible, straightforward poetry.

Life and career
Wilmink was born in Enschede and studied Dutch and history at the University of Amsterdam. From 1960 to 1978, he taught modern literature at the same university. He wrote many songs for musicals and wrote a number of novels for young adults. At first he mainly wrote for adults, but later mainly for children.

His first publication was in 1966: Brief van een Verkademeisje (Eng: "letter from a Verkade girl"). His poem "Ben Ali Libi," inspired by Dutch Jewish magician Michel Velleman, who was murdered at the Sobibor extermination camp, has become one of his most famous poems.

From 1970, he formed a writers' collective, together with Karel Eijkman, Hans Dorrestijn, Ries Moonen, Fetze Pijlman and Jan Riem. They contributed a lot to television programs such as De Stratemakeropzeeshow, Het Klokhuis, De Film van Ome Willem, Sesamstraat and Kinderen voor Kinderen.

He received numerous prizes for his work, including the Louis Davids Prijs in the 1970s, the Zilveren Griffel in 1983 and 1994, the Nienke van Hichtum-prijs in 1985, the Gouden Griffel in 1986, and the Theo Thijssen-prijs in 1988.

While never really well-known as a performing artist, though he sang and played accordion, a lot of Dutch people know Wilmink's songs. He performed regularly with his group in the nineties.

Many Dutch artists have performed Wilminks poetry, including Herman van Veen, Wieteke van Dort, Joost Prinsen and the cabaret group Don Quishocking. Many of his texts have been put to music by Harry Bannink and Frank Deiman.

In later life, his health declined due to a number of strokes.

Works

Prose
1971 - About cabaret (IVIO)
1972 - A strange tiger and other poems (Aarts / 2nd edition 1978)
1972 - Seven songs for a peak (Aarts)
1973 - It happens to everyone: twenty songs for children (Aarts)
1975 - Business from Heaven: songs for children (Aarts)
1975 - Messages for anxious children (Cosmos)
1976 - The party of the Amstel: a fairy tale (Aarts)
1976 - The scared animalforrest (Kosmos / 5th edition 1987)
1977 - The thirteen months of the year: romantic piano pieces for beginners (Rap)
1977 - neighborhood boys (Cosmos)
1977 - The songs for children (Aarts / 4th edition 1984)
1977 - Far from town (Cosmos)
1978 - Jan Elephant (Aarts)
1979 - Murder in the swamp (Cosmos)
1980 - Ghost between ghosts (Foundation CPNB)
1980 - The amazing journey of Jacob Moonshine and Sientje Starfish (Aarts)
1980 - Dorus dragon (Heureka / 2nd edition 1984)
1981 - Two girls in Twente: stories and poems (Bekadidact)
1981 - Far from the city and neighborhood boys (Cosmos)
1982 - Near the houses (Kosmos / 2nd edition 1983)
1983 - Far friends: 44 new songs (Bakker)
1983 - Two brothers (Horstink)
1983 - Koen, do my shoe ?: Willem Wilmink's close correspondence course (Van Holkema & Warendorf)
1983 - Ali Baba (Leopold)
1984 - The fist this fist songs from film Uncle William (Aarts)
1984 - Look with your eyes closed: songs for children (Harlequin)
1984 - Three trips Louis (Horstink)
1984 - A while later (Foundation CPNB)
1984 - The wrong pan (bakery / 4th edition 1992)
1985 - Where the heart is full of Willem Wilmink's close correspondence course (Van Holkema & Warendorf / 3rd edition 1986)
1985 - We'll see what it is: songs for growing children (Bakker)
1986 - Climb into your pen (PTT Post)
1986 - Hear! So never sung! Hear !: an anthology of his poems (Bakker)
1986 - Willem Wilmink omnibus (bakery / 2nd edition 1988)
1986 - Collected songs and poems (bakery / 5th edition 1999)
1987 - Somewhere in France (PTT Post)
1987 - Good evening, musician Willem Wilmink's close correspondence course (Van Holkema & Warendorf)
1988 - They say that the earth revolves 37 new poems (Bakker)
1988 - Today is the big day: Crash Course occasion seal (Van Holkema & Warendorf)
1988 - The treacherous child: a few poems by Hendrik de Vries (Baker, also appeared as a thesis Tilburg)
1989 - The child is father of the man: an anthology of his own work (Bakker)
1989 - Jack, Jacky and the juniors along roads iron (Wiggers, Inmerc)
1989 - Rutgers trip (Bakker)
1989 - The Story of Kees (scenario of Duren André television film)
1990 - Should be feared that it never existed ?: 34 new poems (Bakker)
1991 - Jack, Jacky and the juniors: Christmas stories (Wiggers)
1991 - In the kitchen of the muse: closing the entire correspondence course (Baker / 2nd edition 1996)
1992 - A dog traveling: poems for reasonable five-year-olds (Bakker)
1992 - Direction England (scenario for a television film by André Duren)
1993 - I get it: songs for young children (Bakker)
1993 - The anthem (Van Goor / 3rd edition 1998)
1994 - Willem Wilmink (Rider)
1995 - ABC (Querido)
1995 - Beware of pirates: songs (Walvaboek)
1995 - Severe enough: songs and poems from 1986 (Baker)
1995 - Ali Baba and the forty artists (Zircon; Beehive)
1996 - I had as a child a home and hearth (bakery / 5th edition 2004)

Poetry
1971 - , wheat sheaves, songs and poems
1972 - Seven songs for a peak
1972 - A strange tiger and other poems
1977 - For a nude person (anthology)
1988 - Collected songs and poems
1988 - They say that the earth revolves
1990 - Should be feared that it never existed?
1992 - Heftan tattat! Gedichn in Urban Low Saxon (De Oare Utjouwerij)
1993 - Javastraat, enhanced with an old and a new song, two old poems and a preface: Why and how to write (The Oare Utjouwerij)
1994 - Severe enough, Nine new poems (The Oare Utjouwerij)
1996 - Carmina Burana, Orff's choice translated (The Oare Utjouwerij)
1996 - An own Song of Songs (The Oare Utjouwerij)
1999 - The Princess Pathmos, Enschedese folk musical (The Oare Utjouwerij)
2002 - Heftan tattat! 24 poems in Urban Low Saxon (De Oare Utjouwerij, 7th edition 2008)

Poetry for children
1973 - It happens to everyone
1975 - Business from heaven
1975 - Messages for anxious children (anthology)
1977 - The thirteen months of the year
1985 - We'll see what it is: songs for growing children
1992 - A dog traveling
1995 - Musical images: poems by Mussorgsky (The Children, The Picture Gallery), Saint-Saëns (Carnival of the Animals)

Prose for children
1975 - The scared Dierenbos
1976 - The party of the Amstel
1977 - Far from town
1977 - neighbor boys
1979 - Murder in the swamp
1980 - Ghost between ghosts
1981 - Two girls in Twente (stories and poetry)
1982 - Near the houses
1984 - Three trips Louis
1986 - Where the heart is full of
1988 - Good evening, Speelman
1988 - Today is the big day
1991 - In the kitchen of the muse. fill the entire correspondence course

Essays
1988 - From Roodeschool to Lille. A personal look at the Dutch song
1989 - You know that you do not exist
1990 - What I've found, you never guess

Photo gallery

References

External links

literairnederland.nl
Biografie met foto's en liedteksten van Seniorplaza
Koninklijke Bibliotheek - dossier Willem Wilmink
Stichting De Roos
Willem Wilmink op SchrijversInfo

1936 births
2003 deaths
Dutch male poets
People from Enschede
20th-century Dutch poets
20th-century Dutch male writers
Nienke van Hichtum Prize winners
Gouden Griffel winners